The Official Handbook of the Vast Right-Wing Conspiracy is a 2004 book written by Mark W. Smith. This book was mainly written to advocate some of the political ideas of American Republicans. It provides controversial arguments on important issues such as the  war on terror, taxes, abortion, the death penalty, etc. The term, "vast right-wing conspiracy" was made famous by Hillary Rodham Clinton.

2004 non-fiction books
Political books